The Hundred of Nunnyah is a hundred within County of Dufferin, South Australia. and was founded in 1913.

The traditional owners of the hundred are the Wirangu peoples.

See also
 Lands administrative divisions of South Australia

References

Nunnyah